Shuga Cain is the stage name of Jesus Martinez (born November 20, 1977), an American drag queen and baker who came to international attention on the eleventh season of RuPaul's Drag Race.

Early life 

Martinez was born in Oakland, California and as a child moved to Northern California, where he grew up in a predominantly caucasian neighborhood. His father was Salvadoran, and his mother was Apache with Spanish ancestry. He received a Bachelor of Music degree from the University of Wisconsin–Eau Claire and a Master of Music degree from DePaul University, both in applied voice.

Career
In 2011, Martinez starred in a production of Xanadu, portraying Sonny Malone.

Cain started drag full time in 2017, quitting a six-figure corporate job with the Scholastic Corporation to pursue it. In March 2018, Cain was a part of Max Emerson's Drag Babies series, hosted by Bob the Drag Queen. She was a Drag Mentor, alongside Peppermint and Chi Chi DeVayne.

Cain was announced to be one of fifteen contestants competing on season eleven of RuPaul's Drag Race on January 24, 2019. In episode 3, Cain was a part of the historic six-way lipsync (the first time in the show history in which more than two contestants had to lipsync to avoid elimination), which she survived. Cain lipsynced once again in episode 5, where she sent home Ariel Versace to Whitney Houston's "I'm Your Baby Tonight". Despite never winning a challenge, Cain placed in the top during the season's Snatch Game challenge, where she portrayed Charo. Finally, Cain was eliminated in the 10th episode after lipsyncing to No More Drama by Mary J. Blige against Vanessa Vanjie Mateo. She finished the competition in 7th place.
During her time on the show, Cain released Shuga in the Raw, where she recapped every episode of season 11.

From March 26 to September 6, she was a part of the rotating cast for RuPaul's Drag Race: Season 11 Tour, presented by Voss Events and World of Wonder, and hosted by Asia O'Hara. The show kicked off in Los Angeles on May 26 during the RuPaul's DragCon LA wrap party (hosted by Drag Race judge Michelle Visage) and concluded with a final bow on September 6 in New York City (also hosted by Visage) at the top of RuPaul’s DragCon NYC.

She was announced to host Gimme Some Shuga, a six episode mini-series on WOWPresents Plus. The series focuses on Cain and ace baker Justin Salinas creating cakes inspired by RuPaul's Drag Race legends. She was announced as part of the cast for A Drag Queen Christmas, a Christmas-theme drag show presented by M&P, hosted by Nina West. Other queens in the lineup include Shea Coulee, Willam, Latrice Royale, Thorgy Thor, Manila Luzon, and Lady Bunny.

Personal life 
Cain is currently engaged to Gilbert Gaona of Atascadero, CA.

Filmography

Television

Web series

Music videos

Discography

Singles

Theatre

See also
 LGBT culture in New York City
 List of LGBT people from New York City

References

External links

 
 Jesus Martinez on IMDb

1977 births
Living people
American drag queens
Gay entertainers
Hispanic and Latino American drag queens
LGBT people from California
LGBT Hispanic and Latino American people
People from New York (state)
Shuga Cain